Laidley South is a rural locality in the Lockyer Valley Region, Queensland, Australia.

History 
The locality was named on 3 June 1994. Its name is derived from the town name of Laidley, which itself derives from the naming of Laidleys Plain by Allan Cunningham after James Laidley (1786-1835) New South Wales Deputy Commissary General.

Laidley State School  opened on 1 April 1864. In 1888 it was renamed Laidley South State School. The school closed on 9 December 1983. It was on Mulgowie Road.

References 

Lockyer Valley Region
Localities in Queensland